Night Comes to the Cumberlands (1963) is a book by Harry Caudill that brought attention to poverty in Appalachia and is credited with making the Appalachian area a focus of the United States government's "war on poverty". In Poverty in the United States: An Encyclopedia of History, Politics, and Policy, the book is described as a "definitive text on poverty in Appalachia among journalists, academics, and government bureaucrats concerned with economic inequality in America."

References

External links
Fifty Years of Night, a follow-up investigation by the Lexington Herald-Leader in 2012–2013

1962 non-fiction books
Sociology books
Poverty in the United States
1960s in the United States
Books about Appalachia
Little, Brown and Company books